The year 1978 was the 197th year of the Rattanakosin Kingdom of Thailand. It was the 33rd year in the reign of King Bhumibol Adulyadej (Rama IX), and is reckoned as year 2521 in the Buddhist Era.

Incumbents
King: Bhumibol Adulyadej 
Crown Prince: Vajiralongkorn
Prime Minister: Kriangsak Chamanan
Supreme Patriarch: Ariyavangsagatayana VII

Events

December
9-20- The 1978 Asian Games were held in Bangkok again for the third time.

 
Years of the 20th century in Thailand
Thailand
Thailand
1970s in Thailand